Pickwick Landing State Park is a state park in Pickwick Dam, Hardin County, Tennessee, located in the southeastern United States.  The park is situated around the Pickwick Lake impoundment of the Tennessee River, and is named for Pickwick Landing, a 19th-century riverboat stop.

History
The park was created in 1969 when the state of Tennessee purchased the town of Pickwick Village from the Tennessee Valley Authority.

Amenities
The park contains a golf course, a 119-room inn, ten cabins, two campgrounds, two picnic pavilions, The Captain's Galley Restaurant, and a marina.

Campgrounds
The main campground has 48 sites, each equipped with a picnic table, grill, and electrical and water hook-ups. The other campground, Bruton Branch Campground, has 33 sites.

References

External links
Official website

State parks of Tennessee
Protected areas of Hardin County, Tennessee